Punnyurkulam is a village in Thrissur district of Kerala, the southwestern state of India.

Location
The village is located 10 km north west to the world-famous temple town Guruvayur along the Guruvayur-Ponnani state highway.

History
Punnayurkuam is famous for its cultural heritage, the midi level scripts and literatures describes the region was part of the princely state of Valluvanad, the dynasty who ruled the region from AD 400 to AD 1300 until the Saamoothiri dynasty of erstwhile state of Kozhikode (anglicised Calicut) conquered Valluvanadu and annexed the state. The village is the birthplace to many award-winning writers Nalappat Narayana Menon, Nalappatt Balamani Amma and Kamala Das to name the few.

Poet Kamala Surayya
Kamala Surayya's major work Balyakala Smaranakal plots the village and its heritage. Temples like kadikkad shiva temple, punnayurkulam Bhagawati Temple, Parur Siva Temple and Govidapuram Krishna Temple are few cultural icons of the village.

Punnayurkulam V Bappu 
Punnayurkulam V Bappu was a voracious poet from Punnayurkulam, Kerala. Muthumaala and Shwasikkunna Shavangal are some of his notable works. Apart from poetry, other literary works were also published. His work Oru Persian Kadha, the translation of the famous Badarul Muneer Husnul Jamal  of Moinkutti Vaidyar to malayalam received the Kerala Sahithya Academy special award.

References

Villages in Thrissur district
Guruvayur